Toivo Niiranen (26 February 1919, Liperi – 15 June 2003) was a Finnish smallholder and politician. He was imprisoned for political reasons for a while in 1944. Niiranen was a Member of the Parliament of Finland from 1951 to 1966, representing the Finnish People's Democratic League (SKDL). He was a member of the Central Committee of the Communist Party of Finland (SKP) as well.

References

1919 births
2003 deaths
People from Liperi
Communist Party of Finland politicians
Finnish People's Democratic League politicians
Members of the Parliament of Finland (1951–54)
Members of the Parliament of Finland (1954–58)
Members of the Parliament of Finland (1958–62)
Members of the Parliament of Finland (1962–66)
Prisoners and detainees of Finland